Decatur High School is a public high school located in Decatur, Texas (United States). It is part of the Decatur Independent School District located in central Wise County and classified as a 4A school by the UIL.  In 2015, the school was rated "Met Standard" by the Texas Education Agency.

Athletics
The Decatur Eagles offer many opportunities for students to participate in sports. - 

Cross Country, Volleyball, Football, Basketball, Powerlifting, Swimming, Soccer, Golf, Tennis, Track, Softball & Baseball

State Titles
Boys Cross Country - 
2001(3A), 2005(3A), 2006(3A), 2012(3A) 2018 (4A), 2019 (4A)
Girls Cross Country - 
1999(3A), 2005(3A), 2008(3A), 2009(3A)
Boys Golf - 
1976(2A), 1977(2A)
Volleyball - 
2013(3A), 2014(4A), 2018(4A), 2020 (4A), 2021(4A)
One Act Play - 
2006(3A)

References

External links
Decatur ISD

Schools in Wise County, Texas
Public high schools in Texas